183rd Division may refer to:

183rd Volksgrenadier Division (Wehrmacht)
183rd Infantry Division (Wehrmacht)
183rd Division (People's Republic of China)

Military units and formations disambiguation pages